Naveen Patnaik was elected as chief minister of Odisha, India, for the fourth time in 2014. Here is the list of his ministry:

Departments

Biju Janata Dal
Odisha ministries
Cabinets established in 2014
Cabinets disestablished in 2019
2014 establishments in Odisha
2019 disestablishments in India